The Kentucky Downs Ladies Sprint Stakes, raced as the Mint Ladies Sprint Stakes is a Grade III American Thoroughbred horse race for fillies and mares that are three years old or older, over a distance of  furlongs on the turf held annually in September at Kentucky Downs racetrack in Franklin, Kentucky during their short turf meeting.  The event currently carries a purse of $600,000.

History 
The race was inaugurated in 2013 with an attractive purse offered of $150,000.

In 2018 the event was upgraded to a Grade III.

With the influx of gaming revenue at Kentucky Downs the purse for the event has risen dramatically to nearly $500,000 offered by 2019.

Records
Speed record: 
  furlongs – 1:15.35 - In Good Spirits (2021)

Margins: 
 2 lengths – Lull  (2017)

Most wins by a jockey  
 2 – Tyler Gaffalione (2019, 2020)
 2 – Florent Geroux (2016, 2018)

Most wins by a trainer
 3 – Mark E. Casse (2015, 2016, 2020)
 3 – Wesley A. Ward (2013, 2014, 2022)

Winners

References 

Kentucky Downs
Graded stakes races in the United States
Grade 3 stakes races in the United States
Recurring sporting events established in 2013
2013 establishments in Kentucky
Sprint category horse races for fillies and mares
Horse races in Kentucky
Turf races in the United States